June 2018

See also

References

killings by law enforcement officers
 06